Robert Kerr (3 August 1901–1972) was a Scottish footballer who played in the Football League for Clapton Orient and Wolverhampton Wanderers.

References

1901 births
1972 deaths
Scottish footballers
Association football forwards
English Football League players
Wishaw F.C. players
Third Lanark A.C. players
Middlesbrough F.C. players
Heart of Midlothian F.C. players
Wolverhampton Wanderers F.C. players
Worcester City F.C. players
Leyton Orient F.C. players